Sylvia Fiedler (born 1 October 1951) is a German diver. She competed at the 1968 Summer Olympics and the 1972 Summer Olympics.

References

1951 births
Living people
German female divers
Olympic divers of East Germany
Divers at the 1968 Summer Olympics
Divers at the 1972 Summer Olympics
Divers from Dresden
20th-century German women